North Baltimore High School is a public high school in North Baltimore, Ohio, United States.  It is the only high school in the North Baltimore Local School District.  Their nickname is the Tigers.  They are members of the Blanchard Valley Conference.

Ohio High School Athletic Association State Championships

Boys Golf – 1980

References

External links
North Baltimore High School on the District Website

High schools in Wood County, Ohio
Public high schools in Ohio